Hans Steiner (1946 - 17 October 2022) was professor (emeritus, active) of psychiatry and behavioral sciences, child and adolescent psychiatry and human development at Stanford University, School of Medicine. In 2010 he was awarded Lifetime Distinguished Fellow by the American Psychiatric Association.

As an emeritus professor, He continued to teach and research and maintained a selective private practice in Palo Alto.

He advocated the developmental psychopathology and developmental psychiatry perspective within psychiatry. He worked in the subfields of aggression, its normal and abnormal development; disruptive behavior disorders (such as conduct disorder, oppositional defiant disorder, attention-deficit hyperactivity disorder); eating disorders (anorexia nervosa, bulimia nervosa); trauma-related psychopathology (acute stress disorder, posttraumatic stress disorder, dissociative disorder, resilience); the overlap between psychiatric and other medical disorders (somatoform disorders, medical trauma); personality development across the life span, and sports psychology.

Education 

Steiner studied medicine at the medical faculty of the University of Vienna and was awarded the doctor medicinae universalis (Dr. med. univ.; title equivalent to M.D.) in 1972. After completing a rotating internship in internal medicine, surgery and obstetrics/gynecology at the Rudolfstiftung in Vienna, he came to the United States (1973) to complete his general psychiatry residency training at the State University of New York (SUNY), Upstate Medical Center, Syracuse, New York (1973–76). He then went on to fellowship training in child and adolescent psychiatry at the University of Michigan, Ann Arbor (1976–78), where he also was the chief resident in the years 1977–78.

Bibliography
Steiner, Hans. (1996): Treating Adolescents. Hoboken, NJ: Jossey-Bass.  
Steiner, Hans. (1997): Treating Preschool Children. Hoboken, NJ: Jossey-Bass.  
Steiner, Hans. (1997): Treating School-Age Children. Hoboken, NJ: Jossey-Bass.  
Steiner, Hans. (2004): Handbook of Mental Health Interventions in Children and Adolescents: An Integrated Developmental Approach (Editor). Hoboken, NJ: Jossey-Bass.   
Steiner, Hans. (2011): Fast Facts: Eating Disorders. Oxfordshire: Health Press Limited.   
Steiner, Hans. (2011): On Becoming a Doctor, Fiction, Poetry, and Memoir (Editor). Stanford: Pegasus Physicians.
Steiner, Hans. (2011): Handbook of Developmental Psychiatry (Editor). Hackensack: World Scientific Publishing.

Honors and awards
Lifetime Distinguished Fellow, American Psychiatric Association (2010) 
Distinguished Fellow, American Psychiatric Association (2003) 
Fellow, American Academy of Child and Adolescent Psychiatry (1987) 
Fellow, American Academy of Psychosomatic Medicine (1990) 
Outstanding Mentor Award, American Academy of Child and Adolescent Psychiatry (1990-3, 1995–6, 1998–9, 2004) 
Dlin/Fischer Award for Significant Achievement in Clinical Research, American Academy of Psychosomatic Medicine (1990) 
Goldberger Award, American Medical Association (1996) 
One of 327 Best Mental Health Experts, Good Housekeeping (1994) 
Fellow, American Psychiatric Association (1992).

Creative writing 

After becoming professor emeritus, Dr. Steiner returned to creative writing, producing short stories, novel, and poems. He had been active in these endeavors up to his years in medical school, writing in German at the time. His writings were in German and in English.

He organized a group of physicians at Stanford who also write creatively, named the Pegasus Physicians. The group meets monthly and discusses works in progress or in the planning stage.

"Diagnosing the human condition: Stanford medical students add art, music and literature to studies" article:
Diagnosing the human condition: Stanford medical students add art, music and literature to studies
The Arts, Humanities & Medicine Program allows Stanford School of Medicine students to explore their artistic passions in conjunction with their medical studies.

References

External links
Hans Steiner M.D. – Home
The Pegasus Physician Writers at Stanford
Events – Heaping Dose

Hans Steiner
Dr. med. Hans Steiner | Stanford Medicine Profiles
Dr. med. Hans Steiner's Profile | Stanford Profiles
For academic reprints of published work please refer to:
Community Academic Profiles – Faculty & Researchers – Stanford Medicine
Girls As Juvenile Delinquents – Term Paper – Cnelson
Comparison of Short-Term Psychological Outcomes of Respiratory Failure Treated by Either Invasive or Non-Invasive Ventilation
New Approaches to Juvenile Delinquency: Psychopathology, Development, and Neuroscience
Heart of Leadership
Your secret mind: A Stanford psychiatrist discusses tapping the motivational unconscious
Classes Taught and Presentations
Your secret mind: A Stanford psychiatrist discusses tapping the motivational unconscious
Events – Heaping Dose
Music @ Stanford: The St. Lawrence String Quartet Chamber Music Seminar at Stanford

Living people
1946 births
American child psychiatrists
Stanford University School of Medicine faculty
University of Vienna alumni
University of Michigan alumni
Austrian psychiatrists